Mate Ghvinianidze (born 10 December 1986) is a Georgian former professional footballer who played as a defender.

Ghvinianidze played three friendlies in 2006 before playing twice in the UEFA Euro 2008 qualifying.

References

External links
 
 

Living people
1986 births
Footballers from Tbilisi
Footballers from Georgia (country)
Expatriate footballers from Georgia (country)
Association football defenders
Georgia (country) international footballers
Expatriate footballers in Germany
Expatriate footballers in Ukraine
FC Dinamo Tbilisi players
FC Lokomotiv Moscow players
TSV 1860 Munich players
FC Sevastopol players
2. Bundesliga players
Ukrainian Premier League players
Expatriate sportspeople from Georgia (country) in Germany
Expatriate sportspeople from Georgia (country) in Ukraine